Jin Yun-seong (born 11 October 1995) is a South Korean weightlifter. He is a two-time silver medalist at the World Weightlifting Championships.

Career 

He won a medal at the 2019 World Weightlifting Championships. 

He won the silver medal in the men's 102 kg event at the 2021 World Weightlifting Championships held in Tashkent, Uzbekistan.

Major results

References

External links 
 

1995 births
Living people
South Korean male weightlifters
World Weightlifting Championships medalists
Weightlifters at the 2020 Summer Olympics
Olympic weightlifters of South Korea
Sportspeople from South Chungcheong Province
21st-century South Korean people